Spiromoelleria is a genus of small sea snails with calcareous opercula, marine gastropod mollusks in the family Colloniidae.

Species
Species within the genus Spiromoelleria include:
 Spiromoelleria kachemakensis Baxter & McLean, 1984
 Spiromoelleria quadrae (Dall, 1897)

References

External links
 To ITIS
 To World Register of Marine Species

Colloniidae
Monotypic gastropod genera